The Javan bulbul (Ixos virescens) is a songbird species in the bulbul family. It is the type species of the genus Ixos. It is endemic to the island of Java in Indonesia in its natural habitat of subtropical or tropical moist montane forests. It is not considered a threatened species by the IUCN.

Taxonomy and systematics
The Javan bulbul is sometimes classified in the genus Hypsipetes, presumably based on an earlier error in the Sibley taxonomy. The specific epithet virescens was given to the present species by Coenraad Jacob Temminck in 1825 and pre-dates the same name as given to the Nicobar bulbul by Edward Blyth in 1845. The olive bulbul has also been given the same scientific binomial, Hypsipetes virescens. Alternate names for the Javan bulbul include the green mountain bulbul, green-backed bulbul, green-winged bulbul, rufous-bellied bulbul, streaked bulbul and streaked mountain bulbul. The name 'streaked bulbul' should not be confused with the species of the same name, Ixos malaccensis.

Subspecies
One subspecies is currently recognized:
 Javan bulbul (I. v. virescens) - Temminck, 1825: Also named the Javan streaked bulbul. Found on Java
The Sumatran bulbul (I. sumatranus) of Sumatra was formerly considered a subspecies (with both species being grouped together as the Sunda bulbul), but more recent studies have found it to be a distinct species.

References

Notes

Sources
 
 Gregory, Steven M. (2000): Nomenclature of the Hypsipetes Bulbuls (Pycnonotidae). Forktail Vol. 16: 164–166. PDF fulltext

Ixos
Bulbuls
Birds described in 1825
Taxonomy articles created by Polbot
Birds of Java
Endemic fauna of Java